The Temple of Lemminkäinen is a cave in Gumbostrand village, located in Sipoo, Finland. It is an underground temple depicted in The Bock Saga, a collection of stories by Ior Bock; the mouth of the temple, according to the saga, is located under a rock that Bock calls Kyypelivuori. The name of cave refers to Lemminkäinen, a figure in Finnish mythology and one of the main characters of the ''Kalevala.

According to Bock, the mouth of the temple was closed in 987, when Christianity arrived in Uusimaa and pagan traditions had to be hidden. During the excavations carried out between 1987 and 1999, a tunnel about 50 meters long was opened under the rock, but no temple has been found. Due to the lack of money, the excavation was not continued and the Finnish Heritage Agency has managed to characterize the site as a mere natural formation and has never believed that anything of archaeological significance can be found there. However, later Marcus Lundqvist, a member of the Tempelberg Association, found an ax blade at the bottom of the excavated cave, which the agency has estimated to be possibly from the 12th century.

In the summer of 2007, the excavation project was scheduled to continue, but this did not materialize. Juha Javanainen, the editor of Bock's book, has said in October 2010 that he hopes that the excavations can start again someday, but there are no concrete plans yet. Carl Borgen, who has published several books on the saga by Ior Bock, has argued that a group of treasure hunters known as the "Temple Twelve" would continue to dig in the summer of 2022.

See also
 Ior Bock
 Lemminkäinen

References

External links

 Ior Bock ja Lemminkäisen temppeli at Yle Elävä Arkisto (in Finnish)
 Sipoon aarteenetsijät at Yle Uutiset (in Finnish)

Archaeological sites in Finland
Caves of Finland
Pseudohistory
Sipoo